Gábor Sipos (born 1 November 2002) is a Hungarian football midfielder who plays for Nemzeti Bajnokság III club Bicske.

Career statistics
.

References

External links
 
 

2001 births
People from Hódmezővásárhely
Sportspeople from Csongrád-Csanád County
Living people
Hungarian footballers
Hungary youth international footballers
Association football midfielders
Puskás Akadémia FC players
Puskás Akadémia FC II players
Békéscsaba 1912 Előre footballers
Nemzeti Bajnokság I players
Nemzeti Bajnokság II players
Nemzeti Bajnokság III players